Struna means string in several Slavic languages. It is also a Slavic surname that may refer to the following people:

Aljaž Struna (born 1990), Slovenian football defender 
Andraž Struna (born 1989), Slovenian football defender, brother of Aljaž
Josef Struna, Czech wrestler

See also
 
Struna River in Romania

Slovene-language surnames